Əhməd Ticani (born 10 November 1987) is a Nigerian football striker who plays for Shusha in the Azerbaijan First Division.

Azerbaijan Career statistics

References

1987 births
Living people
Nigerian footballers
Expatriate footballers in Azerbaijan
Nigerian expatriate footballers
FC Baku players
Nigerian expatriate sportspeople in Azerbaijan
Association football forwards
Shusha FK players